Diplahan, officially the Municipality of Diplahan (Chavacano: Municipalidad de Diplahan), is a 3rd class municipality in the province of Zamboanga Sibugay, Philippines. According to the 2020 census, it has a population of 32,585 people.

Geography

Barangays
Diplahan is politically subdivided into 22 barangays.

Climate

Demographics

Economy

Notable personalities

Wilter Palma - incumbent Governor of Zamboanga Sibugay (2013–Present); former Mayor of Diplahan (before 2013)

References

External links

 Diplahan Profile at PhilAtlas.com
 [ Philippine Standard Geographic Code]

Municipalities of Zamboanga Sibugay